Bagh Helli District is in Soltaniyeh County, Zanjan province, Iran. At the latest census in 2016, the district had 11,493 inhabitants in 3,605 households. Before the census, the constituent villages of the district were in Soltaniyeh District of Abhar County until the establishment of Soltaniyeh County.

References 

Soltaniyeh County

Districts of Zanjan Province

Populated places in Zanjan Province

Populated places in Soltaniyeh County

fa:بخش باغ حلی